Vivid: The David Braid Sextet Live is the second album by Canadian jazz pianist and composer, David Braid, as well as the second album to feature the group the David Braid Sextet. It was recorded live at Toronto club Top o' the Senator in 2003.

It won the Juno Award for Traditional Jazz Album of the Year in 2005.

Track listing 
All pieces composed and arranged by David Braid

"Reverence" 7:06
"Seraphim" 10:56
"Mister Wallace" 8:54
"The Golden Years" 8:11
"The Music Room" 5:30
"The Call" 8:29
"For JM" 9:31
"What Is This?" 14:44

Personnel 
David Braid – piano
Mike Murley – saxophone
John McLeod – flugelhorn
Gene Smith – trombone
Steve Wallace – bass
Terry Clarke – drums

Source:

References 

2004 live albums
Juno Award-winning albums
David Braid albums